The Weraerai (Wirraayaraay) were an indigenous Australian people of the state of New South Wales. They are to be distinguished from the Ualarai.

Name
The Weraerai ethnonym was formed from their word for no, namely .

Language
The Weraerai language, Wiraiari, is thought to belong to the Wiradjuri branch of the Wiradhuric languages with Robert M. W. Dixon stating that it may be a further dialect of the former.

Country
It took in Yallaroi, and their northernmost extension ran to Warialda and Gilgil Creek, and from Inverell to north of Wallangra on the Macintyre River. Their western frontier was at Garah.

Mythology and social rite of initiation
In one early report by the Reverend Greenway, the Weraerai were said to share much mythology with the Gamilaraay. Using European analogies, he described their supreme god as Baiame, creator of the murri (aboriginal people) who had an earthly regent called Turramūlan, whose name meant 'one-legged' since 'his locomotive instruments, or feet and legs, (were) in the form of an Indian yale, all on one side; hence his name, signifying 'one-legged'. His consort Muni Burribian was delegated with the task of initiating women into the domestic arts. Turramūlan's presence is summoned by the whirling of a bullroarer during the rites of initiation at a bora circle.

Soon the leaders appeared by a long train of aborigines in single file. They were all painted in red, yellow, and white figures, the white prevailing in stripes down their arms and thighs: each was girded with a specially constructed belt or girdle of opossum known as a ghūtūr, and fringed around by a sort of short kilt made of split opossum, native cat, and squirrel skins respectively, according to the totem to which they belonged. Their hair was dressed in various ways and well combed and greased, then frosted over with swandown or that of other birds, each had round their head under the hair, at the sides and back, a band netted closely and broad where it passed over the forehead, this is known as a ngooloomere (from the covering the forehead) this was of a great variety of colour amongst them. Each carried in his left hand a small packet of very fine ashes or white or grey earth dust, the en closing material was of soft bark, this was struck by the right hand, thereby emitting some of the powder within, which floating in the air forms a misty cloud all over. The blows were given in solemn cadence chanted in a subdued voice by all, and added much to the real solemnity of the scene...they entered upon another prepared enclosure, in which lay an enormous representation of a serpent made of stuff mud or clay and branded across by yellow, red, and white adornments and bands...Round this figure the whole body marched in much the same style and manner as at their first entrance on the scene,  but bending forward occasionally as at certain  points fixed simultaneously with a sort of inclination of the body as if expressing reverence. The motions throughout were made with all the accuracy and precision of the most perfectly drilled troops or well taught dancers. When this function was completed and open space prepared there, they formed a square by regularly preserved ranks, and commenced a grand corroboree, moving in unbroken mass forward a space, then backward, then from left to right, then from right to left in one unbroken order, and with faultless precision as to time and manner, their voices and limbs.

History of contact
The Weraerai were reportedly one of the tribes, including the Gamilaraay, that were killed during punitive expeditions that took place and peaked with the Waterloo Creek massacre of 1838.

Alternative names

 Ginniebal
 Juwalarai
 Mooran Mooran.(?)
 Waholari
 Walarai
 Walari
 Warlarai
 Wiraiarai, Weraiari
 Wirra:arai
 Wirri-Wirri
 Wolaroi, Woolaroi
 Wolaroo
 Wollen
 Wolroi

Source:

Some words
  (domestic dog)
  (wild dog)

Notes

Citations

Sources

Aboriginal peoples of New South Wales